Liga Dangdut Indonesia (Indonesian Dangdut League) is an Indonesian dangdut singing competition television series produced by Indonesia Entertainmen Produksi and distributed by Surya Citra Media. It aired on Indosiar from 15 January 2018 to 23 August 2021.

The concept of the series involves discovering recording stars from unsigned singing talents who come from every province in Indonesia, with the winner determined by Indonesian viewers using phones, Internet, and SMS text voting. The winners of the first fourth seasons, as chosen by viewers, are Selfiyani, Fauzul Abadi, Meli Nuryani, and Rahmadonal Muhammad Iqhbal. Some of the notable finalists from this event were Tiyara Ramadhani, Selfi Yamma, and Defri Juliant. Liga Dangdut Indonesia employs a panel of vocal and fashion judges who criticize the contestants' performances.

This show received a world record from the Indonesian World Records Museum as "The talent search program with the most participants and from the most provinces".

References

External links

Liga Dangdut Indonesia on Vidio

Dangdut
2018 Indonesian television series debuts
Indonesian reality television series
Indonesian-language television shows
Indosiar original programming
Singing talent shows